Albert Read may refer to:
Albert Cushing Read (1887–1967), aviator and US Navy admiral
Albert Read (footballer) (1893–1959), English international footballer
Albert Read (executive), managing director of Condé Nast Britain
Albert Read, founder of Science Discovery Center of Oneonta

See also
Bert Read, footballer
Al Read (1909–1987), comedian
Albert Reed (disambiguation)
Albert Reid (disambiguation)